{{Taxobox
| image = Hexanodes vulgata larva.jpg
| image_caption = Hexanodes vulgata| name = Hexanodes vulgata
| regnum = Animalia
| phylum = Arthropoda
| classis = Insecta
| ordo = Coleoptera
| infraordo = Bostrichiformia
| familia = Dermestidae
| genus = Hexanodes| genus_authority = Blair, 1941
| species = H. vulgata| binomial = Hexanodes vulgata
| binomial_authority = (Broun, 1880)
}}Hexanodes vulgata is a species of beetles in the family Dermestidae, the only species in the genus Hexanodes'''''.

References

Dermestidae genera
Monotypic Bostrichiformia genera